Jakub Tokarz (born 14 October 1981) is a Polish paracanoeist. He gold medalled at the 2016 Summer Paralympics in the Men's KL1.

References

External links
 

1981 births
Living people
Place of birth missing (living people)
Polish male canoeists
Paracanoeists of Poland
Paralympic medalists in paracanoe
Paracanoeists at the 2016 Summer Paralympics
Paralympic gold medalists for Poland
Medalists at the 2016 Summer Paralympics
ICF Canoe Sprint World Championships medalists in paracanoe